Coleataenia is a genus of grasses in the tribe Paniceae of the family Poaceae. Until recently this genus was part of Panicum.  In 2010, Zuloaga, Scataglini, & Morrone proposed the transfer of the Panicum sections Agrostoidea and Tenera to the new genus, Sorengia.  However, that same year, because one of the new species' synonyms was in the valid genus Coleataenia,  Robert J. Soreng determined that Sorengia was not a valid name for the new genus and re-published it as Coleataenia.

Species
Coleataenia species include:
 Coleataenia anceps 
 subsp. anceps – beaked panic grass
 subsp. rhizomata  – small beaked panic grass.
 Coleataenia longifolia 
 subsp. longifolia – long-leaved panic grass
 subsp. combsii  – Combs panic grass
 Coleataenia rigidula 
 subsp. rigidula – redtop panic grass
 subsp. condensa  – dense panic grass
 Coleataenia scabrida 
 Coleataenia stenodes 
 Coleataenia stipitata  – tall flat panic grass
 Coleataenia tenera  – southeastern panic grass

See also
List of Poaceae genera

References

Panicoideae
Poaceae genera